Farnsburg Castle is a castle in the municipality of Ormalingen in the canton of Basel-Land in Switzerland.  It is a Swiss heritage site of national significance.

The barons went on to fight in the war against the Swiss, resulting in a siege of the castle in 1444.

The castle, which was still in good condition, changed ownership several times over the centuries until 1709, when the bailiff in residence at the time was expelled and the castle set on fire. Afterwards, the castle stones were used to build new castles elsewhere and Farnsburg fell quickly into ruin.

See also
 List of castles in Switzerland

References

External links

Link to page about Ruine Farnsburg on the Upper Rhine Valley tourism site (English)

Link to Ruine Farnsburg on the Baselland Tourism site (German)

 

Cultural property of national significance in Basel-Landschaft
Ruined castles in Switzerland
Castles in Basel-Landschaft